The Youth Organisation of New Democracy is the youth organisation of the liberal Greek political party New Democracy. It was founded in 1974 by young members of New Democracy.

Universities and schools 
In universities and technical colleges the members of the Youth Organisation of New Democracy participate in DAP-NDFK and in schools in MAKI.

Assassination of Nikos Temponeras 
During the 1990–1991 student protests against an education bill of New Democracy, ONNED members attacked an occupied school in Patras and Giannis Kalampokas (president of the local branch of ONNED) killed the leftist teacher Nikos Temponeras that supported the occupation of the school (and who was against the education bill in question).

Well-known chairpersons 
 Anastasios Papaligouras (1976–1977)
 Vasilis Michaloliakos (1982–1984)
 Vangelis Meimarakis (1984–1987)
 Georgios Voulgarakis (1987–1989)
 Kostis Chatzidakis (1992–1994)
 Evripidis Stylianidis (1994–1995)
 Andreas Papamimikos (2010–2013)
 Sakis Ioannidis (2013–2016)
 Kostas Dervos (2016–2019)
 Pavlos Marinakis (2019–2022)
 Orfeas Georgiou (2022–present)

References

Youth wings of political parties in Greece
Student wings of conservative parties
International Young Democrat Union
New Democracy (Greece)